STRS or Strs may refer to:

Short tandem repeats, in DNA testing
St. Thomas Residential School, Thiruvananthapuram, Kerala, India
Sir Thomas Rich's School, Longlevens, Gloucester, England
South Thames Retrieval Service, a medical transport service affiliated with Evelina Children's Hospital, London
Sprouse-Reitz (NASDAQ symbol: STRS), a defunct American retail chain
Strauss Group (Tel Aviv Stock Exchange symbol: STRS), an Israeli food company

See also
STR (disambiguation)
California State Teachers' Retirement System, (CalSTRS)